Can't Help Swinging is an album by saxophonist Jimmy Hamilton which was recorded in 1961 and released on the Swingville label.

Reception

Scott Yanow of Allmusic states: "The Can't Help Swingin album showcases Hamilton with pianist Tommy Flanagan, bassist Wendell Marshall and drummer Earl Williams in a quartet. Although Hamilton plays some clarinet (most notably on the atmospheric 'Dancing on the Ceiling'), the emphasis throughout both sets is on his rarely heard tenor. He is less bop-oriented and more basic on the bigger horn than on his usual ax, swinging hard and showing just how strong a tenor player he could be. Worth exploring". All About Jazz said "Jimmy was the sole horn ... The tone is more intimate, showing his sweet side; it would have been perfect on the Moodsville label".

Track listing 
All compositions by Jimmy Hamilton except where noted
 "Panfried" – 7:07
 "Lullaby of the Leaves" (Bernice Petkere, Joe Young) – 4:36
 "Baby Won't You Please Come Home" (Charles Warfield, Clarence Williams) – 4:39
 "Definite Difference" – 3:13
 "There Is No Greater Love" (Isham Jones, Marty Symes) – 6:01
 "Dancing on the Ceiling" (Richard Rodgers, Lorenz Hart) – 6:32
 "Route 9W" – 3:46
 "Town Tavern Rag" – 3:14

Personnel 
Jimmy Hamilton – tenor saxophone, clarinet
Tommy Flanagan – piano
Wendell Marshall – bass
Earl Williams – drums

References 

Jimmy Hamilton albums
1961 albums
Swingville Records albums
Albums recorded at Van Gelder Studio
Albums produced by Esmond Edwards